The Lusitanian Catholic Apostolic Evangelical Church in Portugal is a member church of the Anglican Communion.

Membership
The church has around 5,000 members.

Structure
As an Episcopal denomination, the church is governed by a bishop (Greek, επίσκοπος episcopos). The Lusitanian Church is a diocese with two archdeaconries, for the North and South of Portugal, and 14 parishes. It also has missions. The bishop has his episcopal see at Lisbon, where his throne is located in St Paul's Cathedral. The administration of the diocese is centred at Oporto.

Worship and liturgy
In the early days of the church, a translation into Portuguese from 1849 of the 1662 edition of the Book of Common Prayer was used. In 1884 the church published its own prayer book based on the Anglican prayer books, Roman Rite, and Mozarabic liturgies. The intent was to emulate the customs of the primitive apostolic church.

See also

St Paul's Cathedral, Lisbon — seat of the Lusitanian Church
Protestantism in Portugal

References

Bibliography
 Anglican Communion, and Church of England. The Iberian Churches. [London] [14 Great Peter St., SW1P 3NQ]: Anglican Consultative Council, 1980. Responsibility: report to the Archbishop of Canterbury by the commission appointed to consider the application by the Lusitanian Church and the Spanish Episcopal Church for full integration into the Anglican Communion.
 Church of Ireland, and William Conyngham Plunket Plunket. The Irish Bishops and Church Reform in Spain and Portugal: A Record of the Action Taken by the Irish Episcopate at Their Meeting February 20, 1894. Dublin: Hodges, Figgis, 1894.
 Colóquio comemorativo do centenário da Igreja do Torne. Vila Nova de Gaia de ha cem anos. Vila Nova de Gaia: Junta Paroquial de S.João Evangelista, 1995. 
 Iglesia Española Reformada Episcopal, and Colin Ogilvie Buchanan. Liturgies of the Spanish and Portuguese Reformed Episcopal Churches. Grove, 1985. 
 Igreja Lusitana Católica Apostólica Evangélica. Eucaristia ou Ceia do Senhor. [Pôrto]: [Imprensa Social], 1963. 
 Igreja Lusitana Católica Apostólica Evangélica. O livro de oração comum; administração dos sacramentos e outros ofícios divinos na Igreja Lusitana. Porto, Portugal: Tipo-Lito de Gonçalves & Nogueira, 1928.
 Igreja Lusitana Católica Apostólica Evangélica. Lusitanian Church, Catholic Apostolic Evangelical: A Century of Portuguese Anglican Witness. Vila Nova de Gaia: [s.n.], 1985.
 Igreja Lusitana Católica Apostólica Evangélica (Portugal). Ecclesia. Orgão Oficial Da Igreja Lusitana Católica Apostólica Evangélica. Ano 5. No. 24. Ano 6. No. 25/27. Nov. 1953, Jan/Maio 1954. 1953.
 Irwin, O. A. C. Pilgrim Churches: The Spanish and Portuguese Reformed Episcopal Churches. [London, England]: [Houghton & Sons, Ltd.], 1956. 
 The Lusitanian Church Catholic, Apostolic, Evangelical: Is Episcopal, Essentially National, Truly Catholic and Apostolic, Really Independent of Rome or of Any Other Foreign Authority, and Only with These Features Indispensable to a Truly Evangelical, Independent and National Church Has She Any Right to Exist. Oporto: Mendonça Press, 1913.
 Macdonald, John A. 2013. "Dioceses Extra-Provincial to Canterbury (Bermuda, the Lusitanian Church, the Reformed Episcopal Church of Spain, and Falkland Islands)". 464-473. IN: Markham, Ian S.; Provinces; Markham/The Wiley-Blackwell Companion to the Anglican Communion; The Wiley-Blackwell Companion to the Anglican Communion; 464-473; John Wiley & Sons, Ltd: Chichester, UK. Summary: This chapter describes three dioceses and one parish that are extra-provincial and come under the primatial authority of the Archbishop of Canterbury. The three dioceses are the Spanish Reformed Episcopal Church (Iglesia Espanola Reformada Episcopal), the Lusitanian Catholic Apostolic Evangelical Church of Portugal (Igreja Lusitana Catolica Apostolica Evangelica), and the Diocese of Bermuda. The Falkland Islands are considered a parish and receive Episcopal attention from a bishop commissary appointed by the Archbishop of Canterbury.
 Moreira, Eduardo. Esboço da história da Igreja Lusitana. [Portugal]: Edição do Sínodo da Igreja Lusitania Católica Apostólica Evangélica, 1949. 
 Plunket, William Conyngham Plunket, R. Stewart Clough, and Thomas Godfrey Pembroke Pope. The Divine Offices and Other Formularies of the Reformed Episcopal Churches of Spain and Portugal. London: S.W. Partridge, 1882.
 Ribeiro, António Pinto. Catecismo de doutrina cristã: destinado à instrução religiosa dos alunos das escolas primárias da Igreja Lusitana Católica Apostólica Evangélica. [Porto]: Edição do Sínodo da Igreja Lusitania, 1949.
 Ordem da eucaristia: segundo o rito da Igreja Lusitana: edição do Sínodo da Igreja Lusitana Católica Apostólica Evangélica. S.l: s.n.], 1969.

Further reading 

Church Reform in Spain and Portugal: A Short History of the Reformed Episcopal Churches of Spain and Portugal, from 1868 to the Present Time, by H. E. Noyes (1897)
Liturgia da Igreja Lusitana (1991) 
Reformation Movements in Foreign Churches (with Special Reference to Spain and Portugal), by William Conyngham Plunket (1885)

External links
Official Web site 

Extra-provincial Anglican churches
Anglicanism in Europe
Protestantism in Portugal
Anglican Communion church bodies
Portugal
Members of the World Council of Churches
Religious organizations established in 1880
Evangelical organizations established in the 19th century
1880 establishments in Portugal